Kanamachi may refer to:

Kanamachi, traditional game popular in Bangladesh and India
Kanamachi (film), 2013 Bengali film
Kanamachi (TV series), Bengali television series
Kanamachi, Tokyo, district of Katsushika, Tokyo, Japan
Kanamachi Station, railway station in Katsushika, Tokyo, Japan